Hell Let Loose is a multiplayer tactical first-person shooter video game developed by Australian studio Black Matter and published by Team17. Players fight in iconic battles of the Western and Eastern Fronts of World War II at the platoon level.

The game was announced via a successful Kickstarter campaign in 2017, where it raised US$220,000. It was initially released for Microsoft Windows as an early access title on 6 June 2019, with full release in July 2021. It was released for PlayStation 5 and Xbox Series X/S on 5 October 2021.

Gameplay 

Matches are 50 vs. 50 combined arms battles between two teams of either Germans, Americans, Soviets and in the near future, the Commonwealth Forces. Each faction consists of multiple smaller rifle squads of six soldiers, armoured squads of three soldiers, or recon squads of two soldiers.
As of February 2023, two game modes exist in the game: Warfare and Offensive. In both modes, the map is divided into sectors that each team seeks to capture and control. In the Warfare mode, the game is won by either controlling all sectors at a given point in time, or by controlling a majority of them when the timer runs out, essentially functioning as capture the flag. In the Offensive mode, a defending team is in control of all sectors at the beginning of the match, and the objective for the opposing side is then to capture all of them before the timer runs out.

Communication is intended as a central gameplay aspect by the developers. 
Each unit may be led by a single officer, who can communicate with other officers and the commander through a "leadership" voice channel. Similarly, there are unit-only, proximity and party voice channels as well. As an alternative to voice communication featured only on PC, is access to team-wide and unit level text chat.

Hell Let Loose also features an RTS-inspired resource-based strategic meta-game. Each of the two factions fighting will also be assigned a commander, and the commander is in charge of not only the team and squads, but vehicle deployments, air strikes, and supply drops, however these orders cost resources. Resource nodes can be built using supplies by engineers to bolster resource production, and be able to deploy more tanks, air strikes and other orders to help the team fighting on the battlefield, however they can be taken down if found and dismantled by the enemy team.

Development 
Hell Let Loose is developed on Unreal Engine 4. After about two years of initial development and testing following the launch of its Kickstarter campaign,
the game released on Steam as an early-access title on June 6, 2019 — the 75th anniversary of the Normandy landings. The game was released for PlayStation 5 and Xbox Series X/S on 5 October 2021 and the final update of 2022, Update 13, recently made both PC and Console up-to-date to each other in terms of updates and content.

Map design 

The playable maps in the game are designed based on historical WWII theaters of war by combining satellite imagery, archival aerial photography and street-level recreation. According to the developers, the map for Norman town Sainte-Marie-du-Mont is "a 1:1 scale battlefield" recreated through the aforementioned methods.

Reception 

Hell Let Loose received "generally favorable" reviews for Microsoft Windows and Xbox Series X and "mixed or average" reviews for PlayStation 5, according to review aggregator Metacritic.

PCGamesN praised the use of teamwork in the game, writing that "A well-led assault on an enemy strongpoint involves covering the approach with a smokescreen... Taking part in such an assault is a uniquely exhilarating experience that’s like nothing else I’ve felt in a shooter". While enjoying the changes that made Hell Let Loose more lethal, PC Gamer felt the sound wasn't up to par, "My main nitpick is with sound... When everything is tuned correctly, a gun should be so loud that I can't hear my teammate over the radio. This is where Hell Let Loose kinda falls flat. No matter how much I mess with audio sliders, the game never gets loud enough for my liking".

References

External links 
 

2021 video games
Kickstarter-funded video games
Multiplayer video games
Tactical shooter video games
Unreal Engine games
Video games developed in Australia
Windows games
PlayStation 5 games
Xbox Series X and Series S games
World War II first-person shooters
Team17 games
Early access video games